Craig Victory (born 3 February 1980 in Adelaide, South Australia) is a field hockey striker from Australia who played 102 international games for the Australia men's national field hockey team, the Kookaburras. He is a Commonwealth Games, World Cup and Champions Trophy Gold Medalist and was an Olympic Bronze Medalist with the Australia men's national field hockey team the Kookaburras at the 2000 in Sydney.

As a successful coach, he has served as head coach of the South Australian Sports Institute (SASI) hockey program, head coach of the 2011 winning SA Suns (formerly Southern Suns) in the Australian Hockey League, Australian Junior Women's coach and assistant coach to the gold medal-winning Hockeyroos at the 2014 Commonwealth Games.

Personal
Craig lives in Adelaide, South Australia.

Field Hockey - Playing

Club Hockey
Craig played club hockey for the Port Adelaide District Hockey Club Magpies.

State Hockey
He represented South Australia as part of the Southern Hotshots (now known as the SA Hotshots).

International Hockey
Craig was a member of the Australia men's national field hockey team the Kookaburras from 1999 to 2006, playing 102 games and scoring 36 goals. He was a part of the bronze medal-winning Men's team at the 2000 Summer Olympics and won a silver and gold medal at the World Cup and Commonwealth Games respectively.

He had his jaw broken following an on field incident involving Pakistan captain Muhammad Saqlain in a match at the Hamburg Masters in August 2005.

International Playing Career tournaments included:
1999 Men's Hockey Champions Trophy (Brisbane, AUS) – 1st GOLD
2000 Men's Hockey Champions Trophy (Amstelveen, NED) – 5th
2000 Summer Olympics (Sydney, AUS) – 3rd BRONZE
2001 Men's Hockey Champions Trophy (Rotterdam, NED) – 2nd SILVER
2002 Commonwealth Games (Manchester, ENG) – 1st GOLD
2002 Men's Hockey World Cup (Kuala Lumpur, MAS) – 2nd SILVER
2003 Men's Hockey Champions Trophy (Amstelveen, NED) – 2nd SILVER

Field Hockey - Coaching

State Coaching
Craig was head hockey coach of the South Australian Sports Institute program and also served as the Hockey SA Game Development Manager in the early/mid 2000s.

He coached the peak South Australian State Representative team, the SA Suns (then Southern Suns) to victory in the 2011 Australian Hockey League.

International Coaching
Craig was selected as coach of the Australian U21 Junior women's team, the Jillaroos, in January 2013 and coached them until 2016. Key tournaments were:
2013 Women's Hockey Junior World Cup (Monchengladbach, Germany) – 6th

He was also a part of the Senior Women's team, the Hockeyroos, staff as assistant coach for:
2012–13 Women's FIH Hockey World League Semifinals (London, England) – 1st
2012–13 Women's FIH Hockey World League Final (Tucuman, Argentina) – 2nd SILVER
2014 Women's Hockey World Cup (The Hague, Netherlands) – 2nd SILVER
2014 Commonwealth Games (Glasgow, Scotland) – 1st GOLD

References

External links
 
 
 
 

1980 births
Living people
Australian male field hockey players
Olympic field hockey players of Australia
Male field hockey forwards
Australian field hockey coaches
Olympic bronze medalists for Australia
Field hockey players at the 2000 Summer Olympics
2002 Men's Hockey World Cup players
Field hockey players from Adelaide
Olympic medalists in field hockey
Medalists at the 2000 Summer Olympics
Commonwealth Games medallists in field hockey
Commonwealth Games gold medallists for Australia
Field hockey players at the 2002 Commonwealth Games
South Australian Sports Institute coaches
Medallists at the 2002 Commonwealth Games